Latvia competed at the inaugural 7 sports 2018 European Championships from 2 to 12 August 2018. It competed in 5 sports.

External links
 European Championships official site 

2018
Nations at the 2018 European Championships
2018 in Latvian sport